The Assyrian Levies (also known as the Iraq Levies) were the first Iraqi military force established by the British in British controlled Iraq. The Iraq Levies originated in a local Arab armed scout force raised during the First World War. After Iraq became a British Mandate, the force became composed mostly of Assyrians, Kurds and Iraqi Turkmen who lived in the north of the country, while the nascent Iraqi Army was recruited first from the Arabs who had joined the Iraqi Levies and later from the general Arab population (Beth-Kamala). Eventually the Levies enlisted mainly Assyrian soldiers with British officers. The unit initially defended the northern frontiers of the Province of Mosul when Turkey claimed the province and massed its army across the frontiers. After 1928 the prime role of the Levies was to guard the Royal Air Force bases located in Iraq.

The Levies distinguished themselves in May 1941 during the Anglo-Iraqi War and were also used in other theatres of the Second World War after 1942. The force thereafter grew and survived until it was disbanded when control of RAF Habbaniya and RAF Shaibah was handed to Iraq in 1957.

History
The Iraq Levies traced their history to the Arab Scouts organized in 1915 by Major J. I. Eadie, of the British Indian Army who served as a Special Service Officer in the Muntafiq Division in Mesopotamia. He recruited forty mounted Arabs from the tribes around Nasiriyeh, for duty under the Intelligence Department as bodyguard for political officers in southern and central Iraq. By 1918 the Arab Scouts increased to 5,467 Arabs, Kurds, Turkoman, Marsh Arab and Assyrian militia.

At its height, an estimated 40,000 Assyrians served in the Levies.

Organisation
In 1919 the force changed names twice, first to the Militia and then in July to the Iraq Levies when Iraq became a British Mandate. On 12 August 1919, the force became known as the "Arab and Kurdish Levies." Also in 1919 the Iraq Levies were split into a strike force of 3,075 men, based in Baquba, and district Police force of 1,786 men. On  1 August 1919, the Levy and Gendarmerie Orders were published in which the control of the Levies, and the duties of the Inspecting Officer of the Levies, who were limited to inspection and administration, were defined. This put the Levies under the control of three different people: the Inspecting Officer, the Political Officer of the Area, and the Local Administrative Commandant. The budget was dealt with by the Inspecting Officer, except in the Northern Iraqi Provinces of Kirkuk, Sulaimani and Mosul Liwas, where Political Officers dealt with it. Later the Levies came under their own OC Iraq Levies.

The Levies consisted of a Headquarters (first located in Baquba, then Hinaidi, and then in Habbaniya), a Hospital (also in Habbaniya), and numerous numbered field companies. Some of the field companies were later organized into battalions for mobile operations.

1920s
At the 1921 Cairo Conference the mission of the Levies was defined "...to relieve the British and Indian Troops in Iraq, take over outposts in Mosul Vilayat (province) and in Kurdistan, previously held by the Imperial Garrison, and generally to fill the gap until such time as the Iraq National Army is trained to undertake these duties."

Up to 1921 the Levies had consisted primarily of Arabs, Kurds, Turcomans and Shabakis, while the Assyrians had fought independently alongside the Armenians and Allied Forces in an Assyrian war of independence during World War I. Now that an Iraqi Army was to be formed, the Arabs and other Muslim peoples were required to join it rather than to go to the Levies. It was decided to enlist ethnic Assyrians in the Levies.

The Assyrians were prized for their discipline, loyalty, bravery and fighting skills by the British, and were Eastern Aramaic speaking Assyrian Church of the East, Syriac Orthodox or Chaldean Catholic Christians, a Semitic ethnic and religious minority in a generally Arab/Kurdish Muslim population. In July 1922 Orders were issued in which no more Arabs were to be enlisted as they were required to join the new Iraqi Army, and those serving could not re-engage. A 1922 treaty between Great Britain and Iraq allowed for the continued existence of the Levies as "local forces of the Imperial garrison" and specified that its members were "members of the British Forces who are inhabitants of Iraq".

By 1923 the ethnic composition of the Iraq Levies was 50% Assyrian, with a large minority of Kurds, plus an attached battalion of Marsh Arabs and a few Armenians, Mandeans and Turcomans.

In July 1928 the Levies were transferred from the Colonial Office to the Air Ministry and its headquarters was transferred to Hinaidi.

By 1928 the Levies had become entirely Assyrian. The Marsh Arab battalion became the 7th Battalion of the Iraqi Army. The force then expanded rapidly and became known as "Shabanas", a Turkish word meaning a semi-military gendarmerie. Its primary duty was now to protect Royal Air Force bases in Iraq.

As the Assyrian force became more disciplined they rendered excellent service; during the Arab rebellion of the 1920s they displayed, under conditions of the greatest trial, steadfast loyalty to their British officers.

In 1920 the Assyrians had given proof of their discipline and fighting qualities when the Assyrian camps at Mindan and Baquba were attacked by Arab forces, the Assyrians defeating and driving off the Arabs.

1930s
In 1931 Levies and Iraqi army units were patrolling Barzan district. Government troops implied government control, which Shaykh Ahmad still wanted to avoid.

On 1 June 1932 the Levies presented a signed memorial to their commanding officer stating that "all the men had decided to cease serving as from 1st July." The reason was Britain had "failed adequately to ensure the future of the Assyrian nation after the termination of their mandate over Iraq."

Following abortive negotiations through Assyrian officers, British troops were brought in from Egypt to take over the guard and garrison duties of the Levies. Assyrian civilian and religious leaders issued a statement urging all ranks of the Levies to continue in "loyal and obedient service" until a national petition to the League of Nations could be responded to. The effect of this intervention was to calm concern amongst the majority of Levies, who resumed their former duties. Two hundred and fifty men were however discharged from service.

1940s

During 1940/41 Iraq joined the Axis powers and the Battle of Habbaniya took place. During the Rashid Ali rebellion in 1941 the base was besieged by the Iraqi Army encamped on the overlooking plateau.  The siege was lifted by the units based at Habbaniya, including pilots from the training school, a battalion of the King's Own Royal Regiment flown in at the last moment, No. 1 Armoured Car Company RAF, and the RAF's Iraq Levies.  The subsequent arrival of a relief column (Kingcol), part of Habforce sent from Palestine, then a British mandate, combined with the Habbaniya units to force the rebel forces to retreat to Baghdad.  The Levies then recruited an additional 11,000 men, mostly Assyrians, but also some Kurds and Yezidi.

"They had dug trenches and were determined on destroying the Assyrians and taking their properties and possessions. Assyrians painfully remembered the massacre of 1933 in Simele and the surrounding villages and pledged "Never Again!". They remembered the raping and pillaging of defenseless Assyrian villagers."

By 1942, the Iraq Levies consisted of a Headquarters, a Depot, Specialist Assyrian companies, 40 service companies and the 1st Parachute Company, which consisted of 75% Assyrian and 25% Kurd. The new Iraq Levies Disciplinary Code was based largely on the Indian Army Act.

By 1943 the Iraq Levies strength stood at 166 British officers controlling 44 companies; 22 Assyrian, five Mixed Assyrian/Yizidi, ten Kurdish, and four Marsh Arabs. Eleven Assyrian companies served in Palestine and another four served in Cyprus. The Parachute Company was attached to the Royal Marine Commando and were active in Albania, Italy and Greece. In 1943/1944 the Iraq Levies were renamed the Royal Air Force Levies.

In 1945, after the Second World War, the Levies were reduced to 60 British officers and 1,900 other ranks. The RAF Regiment took over command of the Levies and Army personnel were gradually replaced by RAF personnel. During October 1946 the Levies battalions were redesignated as wings and squadrons to conform to the RAF Regiment procedure. In December the Kurdish Squadrons in Cyprus and the Persian Gulf were returned to Iran.

1950s
The RAF Levies continued its escort and guard duties into 1954; when it consisted of 1,200 Assyrians, 400 Kurds, and 400 Arabs. The RAF Levies were disbanded on 2 May 1955, and King Faisal was present along with members of the government, as RAF Habbaniya and RAF Shaibah were handed back to the Iraqi Government, although the RAF remained at Habbaniya until May 1959. Of 515 Assyrians, 195 volunteered for service in the Iraqi Army. At 0800 hours on 3 May 1955, the Levy's quarter guards were relieved by guards from the Iraqi Army. A minor and passing event but it did signify the end of an era as now the Levies had ceased to exist.

The British offered financial compensation, vocational training, and resettlement in civilian life to members of the RAF Levies. Those members with 15 or more years of service were pensioned off. Those with less than 15 years were given a gratuity of one month pay for each year of service. Also, the Levies received full pay up to and including 2 May. Those who were to be discharged on that day received pay and a ration allowance for 28 days terminal leave; plus a civilian clothing allowance and a free railway pass to their homes. Those Levies receiving vocational training had their current rates of pay and allowances continue until the end of their training.

Levy ranks and uniforms
Levy officer ranks were derived from ancient Assyrian military ranks:
Rab Khaila: force leader
Rab Tremma: leader of 200
Rab Emma: leader of 100
Rab Khamshi: leader of 50

Throughout most of their history the Levies wore standard British tropical service and battle dress uniforms, though with RAF rank insignia after 1943. The most distinctive feature was a slouch hat with brim turned back in the Australian style, worn with a white plume for parade.

Medals awarded to the Levies

Cross of Saint George
The Russian Empire recommended and awarded the Cross of Saint George to eight Assyrian members in 1917 during World War I.

Order of the British Empire
A total of ten Orders of the British Empire were awarded to officers of the Iraq Levies.

Five OBEs were awarded to:
Rab Khaila Zaya Giwargis – 1926
Rab Emma Shayin Giwargis – 1926
Rab Emma Daniel Malik Ismail – 1922
Rab Khamshi Zaia Giwargis – 1926

Five MBEs were awarded to:
Rab Kaila Dawid Mar Shimun [honorary]
Rab Tremma Yacouv Khoshaba
Rab Tremma Odishu Natan
Rab Emma Shlimon Bukho
Rab Khamshi Eshu Hamzo

Military Cross

The Military Cross was awarded to the following personnel;

The original Military Cross awarded to Shlimon Slivo.
Rab Emma Stepan Nissan
Rab Emma Isaac Sulaqa Gilyana – 1928
Rab Emma  Shamoon Khoshaba – 1928
Rab Emma Baijan Peko
Rab Emma Ozariu Tamraz – 1926
Rab Khamshi Eshu Saper – 1928
Rab Khamshi Shlimon Sliwa – 1926

Military Medal

The Military Medal was awarded to the following personnel;
Rab Emma Warda Eshu
CQMS 65347 Baitu Marqus – 1928
Corporal Nikola Dinkha
Corporal 55416 Mishu Miro – 1927

Mentioned in Dispatches

Six members of the Iraq Levies were Mentioned in Dispatches
Rab Emma Malam Odai – 1929
Rab Khamshi Barkhu Hormis – 1929
Corporal 55416 Barhku Babu – 1928
Private 55994 Khanania Yakob – 1929
Corporal 1171 Gewergis Shinu – 1944
Lance Corporal 10575 Menaz Gerwergis – 1944

The King has been graciously pleased to approve that the following be Mentioned in recognition of distinguished services in the Middle East:-

"... Lincoln Regiment - Capt. H. J. C. Thomas, MBE (64588), attached Iraq Levies ..."

(London Gazette, 23 December 1941)

Medal for Long Service and Good Conduct

Over 300 Medals for Long Service and Good Conduct awarded for over fifteen years service in the Assyrian Levies.

King George Medal with Clasp

Dozens of King George Medals with Clasp were awarded in 1922 for operations in Rawanduz in Northern Iraq.

General Service Medal with Iraq Clasp

The General Service Medal for Iraq was established in 1924 and was awarded to the Levies by King Faisal I for operations in Iraq between 1924 and 1936.

World War Two Medals
Three different World War Two Medals were awarded to members of the Iraq Levies.
 The War Medal 1939–1945 - Awarded to Levies after 28 days of service in World War II.
 The 1939-1945 Star - Awarded to Levies after six months service in World War II.
 The Italy Star - Awarded to parachute company personnel that served in Albania, Italy and/or Greece.

See also
RAF Iraq Command
RAF Habbaniya
RAF Shaibah
Kirkuk Massacre of 1924
Simele massacre
Iraqforce

For similar units see:
Mesopotamia Rifles
Aden Protectorate Levies

References

External links 

Assyrian battle of Albania at YouTube
A comprehensive website on the Assyrian RAF Levies
RAF Habbaniya Association website

History of the Assyrians
British colonial regiments
Military units and formations of Iraq
Military history of Iraq
Iraqi revolt of 1920
1919 establishments in Iraq
Military units and formations in Mandatory Palestine in World War II